Nagarangalil Chennu Raparkam is a 1989 Indian Malayalam-language black comedy film directed by Viji Thampi and written by Ranjith, starring Jayaram and Sreenivasan. The movie is partially based on the 1986 movie Ruthless People.

Plot

Kunjoottan is a gullible man living in a countryside in Kerala, the only heir to wealthy aristocratic parents Thamburan and Kunjulakshmi. He cannot stand his overprotective father, who is concerned about his son's life after a nightmare he took as prophecy. After the family astrologer Panikker predicts that Kunjoottan would hardly survive age 30 and is prone to motor vehicles accidents, Thamburan hires two ex-mahouts Valiya Raman Nair and Cheriya Raman Nair to entourage Kunjoottan, which further annoys him.

Kunjoottan's childhood friend Ramachandran is back from town with exciting stories about city life. He is in urgent need of money to pay his debts from a failed business. He tricks Kunjoottan into stealing money from his father's vault so that they can run away and enjoy life in the city. By the time Kunjoottan discovers his friend's true intentions, he loses all his money to tricksters in the city. Ramachandran tries to get rid of Kunjoottan since his innocence was landing both in trouble.

Later, they kidnap a girl named Asha whose stepfather M.R.C had hired three men to kill her. After learning about her sad past, both Rama and Kunjoottan decide to help her instead. But Kunjoottan's father is hell-bent on finding his son. Asha's father hires a professional killer named Christopher Luke to kill Asha. After a series of comic mishaps, the killer is captured by police inspector Abu Hassan. Kunjoottan reunites with his father.

Cast

References

External links
 

1980s Malayalam-language films
1989 comedy films
1989 films
Indian black comedy films
Films directed by Viji Thampi
Films scored by Raveendran